Actinoplanes capillaceus is a bacterium from the genus Actinoplanes which has been isolated from soil in Sayama, Japan.

References

External links 
Type strain of Actinoplanes capillaceus at BacDive -  the Bacterial Diversity Metadatabase

Micromonosporaceae
Bacteria described in 2001